No Grave But the Sea is the fifth studio album by Scottish heavy metal band Alestorm, released on 26 May 2017. It's the band's first album to feature guitarist Máté Bodor since the departure of Dani Evans in 2015.

Track listing

A bonus disc in limited and digital deluxe edition versions of the album consist of remixes of each track "for Dogs", replacing the vocals with autotuned barking.

Personnel

Credits for No Grave But the Sea adapted from AllMusic

Alestorm
 Christopher Bowes – lead vocals, keytar
 Máté Bodor – guitars
 Gareth Murdock – bass
 Elliot Vernon – keyboards, unclean vocals, tin whistle
 Peter Alcorn – drums

Additional
 Tobias Hain – brass arrangement, trumpet
 Jan Philipp Jacobs – brass arrangement, trombone
 Tobias Waslowski – violin
 Betsy Neal – backing vocals
 Kane Neal – backing vocals
 Chris Short – backing vocals

Production
 Lasse Lammert – producer, mixing, mastering, vibraslap
 Dan Goldsworthy – artwork, layout
 Adam Opris – photography
 Chris Stropoli – drum technician

Charts

References

Alestorm albums
Napalm Records albums
2017 albums